Bhandal Himmat is a village in Jalandhar district of Punjab State, India. It is located 10.7 km away from Nakodar, 26.7 km from Phillaur, 27 km from district headquarter Jalandhar and 136 km from state capital Chandigarh. The village is administrated by a sarpanch who is an elected representative of village as per Panchayati raj (India).

Demography 
As of 2011, Bhandal Himmat has a total number of 195 houses and population of 942 of which 493 are males while 449 are females according to the report published by Census India in 2011. Literacy rate of Bhandal Himmat is 77.70%, higher than state average of 75.84%. The population of children under the age of 6 years is 90 which is 9.55% of total population of Bhandal Himmat, and child sex ratio is approximately 1195 as compared to Punjab state average of 846.

Most of the people are from Schedule Caste which constitutes 54.99% of total population in Bhandal Himmat. The town does not have any Schedule Tribe population so far.

Per census 2011, 357 people were engaged in work activities out of the total population of Bhandal Himmat which includes 338 males and 19 females. According to census survey report 2011, 98.88% workers describe their work as main work and 1.12% workers are involved in marginal activity providing livelihood for less than 6 months.

Education 
The village has a co-ed upper primary with secondary school founded in 1972. The school provide a mid-day meal as per the Indian Midday Meal Scheme.

Transport

Rail 
Nurmahal train station is the nearest train station however, Phillaur Junction railway station is 26 km away from the village.

Air 
The nearest domestic airport is located 56.4 km away in Ludhiana and the nearest international airport is located in Chandigarh also Sri Guru Ram Dass Jee International Airport is the second nearest airport which is 123 km away in Amritsar.

References 

Villages in Jalandhar district
Villages in Phillaur tehsil